St. Joseph Public Library-Carnegie Branch is a historic Carnegie Library building located at St. Joseph, Missouri.  It was designed by the architect Edmond Jacques Eckel (1845–1934) and built in 1902 in the Classical Revival style.  It is a one-story, brick and limestone building over a raised basement. It features a projecting front portico with four fluted Ionic order limestone columns.  It was built with a $50,000 grant from the Carnegie Foundation.

It was listed on the National Register of Historic Places in 1999.

External links
 Libraries.org | https://librarytechnology.org/library/8535
 Website info | http://sjpl.lib.mo.us/library-locations/carnegie-library/

References

Carnegie libraries in Missouri
Libraries on the National Register of Historic Places in Missouri
Neoclassical architecture in Missouri
Library buildings completed in 1902
Public Library-Carnegie Branch
National Register of Historic Places in Buchanan County, Missouri